Carvel Rock may refer to:

 Carvel Rock (British Virgin Islands), near Cooper Island
 Carvel Rock (United States Virgin Islands), immediately east of Lovango Cay and Congo Cay